Melanella chariessa is a species of sea snail, a marine gastropod mollusk in the family Eulimidae. The species is one of many species known to exist within the genus, Melanella.

Distribution

This species occurs in the following locations:

 North West Atlantic
 United Kingdom Exclusive Economic Zone

Description 
The maximum recorded shell length is 5.6 mm.

Habitat 
Minimum recorded depth is 3229 m. Maximum recorded depth is 3834 m.

References

External links

chariessa
Gastropods described in 1884